Walter S. Greene (May 28, 1834November 15, 1891) was an American businessman, Democratic politician, and Wisconsin pioneer.  He served six years in the Wisconsin State Senate and one year in the State Assembly, representing Jefferson County.

Biography

Walter Greene was born in Salisbury, in Herkimer County, New York, March 23, 1834.  He came west with his family in 1846, settling at the town of Milford, in the Wisconsin Territory.  He attended collegiate courses at the University of Wisconsin and Beloit College and worked as a merchant for several years at Prairie du Chien, Wisconsin.  He subsequently returned to Milford and worked with his father in a milling and manufacturing firm known as "Greene & Son".

While residing at Milford, he served on the town board for several years, served as Jefferson County treasurer, and was elected to the Wisconsin State Assembly for the 1862 session.  He was succeeded in office in 1863 by his father, Nathan S. Greene.  He was subsequently elected to the Wisconsin State Senate from Jefferson County's Senate district in 1872.

In May 1883, he moved to Fort Atkinson, Wisconsin, and was elected to another term in the Wisconsin Senate in 1886.  The next year, he was elected mayor of Fort Atkinson.  He was re-elected in 1890, but was stricken with stomach cancer shortly after the start of the new term.  He was ill for several months before dying at St. Mary's hospital in Milwaukee in November 1891.

Personal life and family
Walter Greene's father Nathan S. Greene also served in the Wisconsin State Assembly. Walter's younger brother William served as an officer in the Union Army during the American Civil War.

Walter Greene married twice.  His first wife, Ella Porter, was the daughter of General James Potter, of Mifflin County, Pennsylvania, and was a great granddaughter of American Revolutionary War major general James Potter.  They had one daughter together.

Walter Greene was survived by his second wife, Jennette Guile, and his daughter Isabella "Belle".

Electoral history

Wisconsin Senate (1872)

| colspan="6" style="text-align:center;background-color: #e9e9e9;"| General Election, November 5, 1872

Wisconsin Senate (1886, 1890)

| colspan="6" style="text-align:center;background-color: #e9e9e9;"| General Election, November 2, 1886

| colspan="6" style="text-align:center;background-color: #e9e9e9;"| General Election, November 4, 1890

References

External links
 

1834 births
1891 deaths
People from Salisbury, Herkimer County, New York
People from Milford, Wisconsin
University of Wisconsin–Madison alumni
Beloit College alumni
Businesspeople from Wisconsin
County officials in Wisconsin
County supervisors in Wisconsin
Wisconsin city council members
Mayors of places in Wisconsin
Democratic Party members of the Wisconsin State Assembly
Democratic Party Wisconsin state senators
19th-century American politicians
People from Fort Atkinson, Wisconsin
19th-century American businesspeople